Gledić Mountains is a mountain range in central Serbia, between cities of Kragujevac, Jagodina and Trstenik. It is popular with mountain walkers. Of historical, cultural and architectural values are monasteries from the 15th and 16th centuries: Kamenac, Kalenić and Ljubostinja.

Products: Black Locust honey, trees, sheep, and wild life. Many village houses in village hamlets like Slatina and Jošovići (Village of Čestin, administrative area of Knić) are over 200 years old. It is easy to travel through the whole range via a recently paved road from Kragujevac (via Grošnica) to Trstenik near Vrnjačka Banja. Mountain roads are good for mountain bikes, cars, and four-wheel drive vehicles. There is a mountain lodge in Čestin (near Adžine Livade, 16km from Kragujevac) and a private accommodation in an inn in the village of Gledić which is over one hundred years old. The mountain range accommodates numerous hunting reserves.

A monument built in 1932 to the glory soldiers who gave their lives in the Balkan Wars (1912-13) and World War I stands in Čestin (Adžine Livade).

The Gledić mountains are sparsely populated as most of its inhabitants have moved to nearby cities throughout the times, but very many have maintained their lands and houses, and visit them during weekends, while many return there in their retirement. Their small holdings are well maintained; various crops are grown, honey is often produced and trees are abundant for firewood. Mobile phones have good connections throughout.

References

Mountains of Serbia
Rhodope mountain range